The Carmarthen by-election of 1957 in Carmarthenshire, Wales, was notable for resulting in the nadir of the British Liberal Party.

Background
The seat became vacant as a result of the death of Sir Rhys Hopkin Morris on 22 November 1956. The Liberal Party was in a period of decline and Hopkin Morris had been one of only six Liberal Members of Parliament. Hopkin Morris's majorities had been narrow and it was recognised that a significant number of voters had favoured him personally and might not transfer their allegiance to a new Liberal candidate.

Further distress for the Liberals was caused by the announcement that Lady Megan Lloyd George, a former Liberal MP with a national reputation, would be running as the Labour candidate. Previously selected prospective candidate for Labour, Brynley Thomas, stood down in her favour. The local Liberals created another dilemma by choosing John Morgan Davies as their candidate; the Liberals were seeking to challenge the ruling Conservatives over the ongoing Suez Crisis and Morgan Davies, like Hopkin Morris, had publicly taken a pro-government stand on the issue. Jo Grimond, who had assumed leadership of the Liberal Party only a few weeks before, had to choose whether to support or disown Morgan Davies. He chose to support him.

The other candidate who ran for the seat was Jennie Eirian Davies of Plaid Cymru.

The Conservatives did not run a candidate; they had not contested the seat since 1935, as one of several seats where the local Conservative and Liberal parties came to agreements where one party would not field a candidate, in order to avoid vote-splitting that could allow Labour to win. This was the second to last by-election in Great Britain, during the 20th Century, in which they did not stand, the last being the unusual circumstances of the 1963 Bristol South East by-election.

Result
The election was held on 28 February 1957. Lloyd George won the seat, swinging the district from Liberal to Labour and dropping the Liberal Party to their historic low of only five seats in Parliament.

See also
 1882 Carmarthen Boroughs by-election
 1924 Carmarthen by-election
 1928 Carmarthen by-election
 1941 Carmarthen by-election
 1966 Carmarthen by-election

References

By-elections to the Parliament of the United Kingdom in Welsh constituencies
Carmarthen by-election
Carmarthen by-election, 1957
Carmarthen by-election
Carmarthen by-election
Elections in Carmarthenshire
20th century in Carmarthenshire